Lythrum junceum is a species of perennial herb in the family Lythraceae native to the Mediterranean Basin, West Asia and Macaronesia. They have a self-supporting growth form and simple, broad leaves. They are associated with freshwater habitat. Individuals can grow to 0.2 m.

Sources

References 

junceum
Flora of Malta
Taxa named by Joseph Banks
Taxa named by Daniel Solander